tetraiodide may refer to:

Carbon tetraiodide, CI4
Diphosphorus tetraiodide, P2I4, an orange crystalline solid and a versatile reducing agent
Silicon tetraiodide, SiI4
Tellurium tetraiodide, TeI4
Titanium tetraiodide, TiI4